Every Second Counts is the fourth studio album by American rock band Plain White T's. It is the first Plain White T's album to be released on Hollywood Records along with Fearless Records. The album peaked at number ten on the US Billboard 200 chart. The album was also certified gold by the Recording Industry Association of America (RIAA) in October 2007.

Use in media

The song "Our Time Now" was used in most commercials and trailers for the ABC Family show Greek, and was performed by the band (along with "Hey There Delilah") in the episode "The Rusty Nail". "Our Time Now" and "You and Me" were used in the Disney Channel Original Movie, Johnny Kapahala: Back on Board. The Plain White T's also performed "Our Time Now" on an episode of the Nickelodeon show iCarly. "Making a Memory" was played during Katy Fox's final episode in Hollyoaks. The same song was put after the US version of The Voices blind auditions, after Christina Aguilera made her choice. The song "Let Me Take You There" was used as the main song for the BBC's Live Masters Golf coverage.

Commercial performance
Every Second Counts debuted at number 89 on the US Billboard 200 chart on the week of September 30, 2006. The album reached its peak at number ten on the chart on the date issued August 11, 2007, selling 39,000 copies that week. On July 3, 2007, the album was certified gold by the Recording Industry Association of America (RIAA) for sales of over 500,000 copies in the United States.

In the United Kingdom, the album peaked at number three on the UK Albums Chart. On July 22, 2013, the album was certified gold by the British Phonographic Industry (BPI) for sales of over 100,000 copies in the UK.

Track listing
All songs written by Tom Higgenson, except where noted.

Standard edition
  "Our Time Now" (Mia Koo, Mike Daly, Higgenson) – 2:50
  "Come Back to Me" (Bret Mazur, Kraig Tyler, Higgenson) – 3:23
  "Hate (I Really Don't Like You)" – 3:47
  "You and Me" – 2:18
  "Friends Don't Let Friends Dial Drunk" (Mazur, Tyler, Higgenson) – 3:22
  "Making a Memory" (Higgenson, Daly) – 2:49
  "So Damn Clever" (Matthew Gerrard, Higgenson) – 3:03
  "Tearin' Us Apart" – 2:36
  "Write You a Song" – 4:01
  "Gimme a Chance" (Higgenson, Mia Koo) – 2:57
  "Figure It Out" (Higgenson, Daly) – 2:45
  "Let Me Take You There" – 3:46
  "Hey There Delilah"  – 3:52
  "Hold On"  – 2:40

The Best Buy version of the album contains two bonus tracks: "Hold On" and an acoustic demo of "Hate (I Really Don't Like You)".

Deluxe edition
A deluxe edition of Every Second Counts was released. It has a different cover, with a white background instead of brown and includes a slipcase. It contains:

CD
 Tracks 1–12 as above
 "Hey There Delilah" – 3:53
 "We Can Work It Out"
 "Hold On" – 2:40

DVD
The DVD includes a live concert in the band's hometown, Chicago. The set list was:
 "Our Time Now"
 "Revenge"
 "All That We Needed"
 "Stop"
 "Friends Don't Let Friends Dial Drunk"
 "You and Me"
 "Come Back to Me"
 "Write You a Song"
 "Tearin' Us Apart"
 "So Damn Clever"
 "Let Me Take You There"
 "Hate (I Really Don't Like You)"
 "Hey There Delilah"
 "Take Me Away"

Personnel
 Tom Higgenson – lead vocals, acoustic guitar
 Tim G. Lopez – lead guitar, backing vocals
 Dave Tirio – rhythm guitar
 Mike Retondo – bass guitar, backing vocals
 De'Mar Hamilton – drums, percussion
 Stephen Barber – keyboards

Charts

Weekly charts

Year-end charts

Certifications

References

Plain White T's albums
Fearless Records albums
2006 albums
Hollywood Records albums